is a Japanese jazz fusion guitarist who is one of the founding members and the main composer of the band Casiopea. He has released 6 solo albums and a compilation. He also works as an instructor of a guitar clinic, and as a producer.

In 1983, Yamaha had manufactured a guitar specifically for Issei Noro, known as the Yamaha SG-IN (I.N. represent his initials.)

In 1987, he joined forces with The Square (now T-Square) guitarist Masahiro Andoh and Hirokuni Korekata. They released 2 live albums and 1 studio album under the name Ottottrio as a side project.

In 1989, Issei Noro was a guest musician who performed with the Sega Sound Team.

It was announced on August 1, 2006 that Casiopea would take a hiatus until further announcement, due to Noro's constant exhaustion from touring and recording.

The closest Casiopea came to a reunion prior to 2012 was Issei Noro's band Inspirits, which included previous Casiopea drummer Akira Jimbo, bassist Yuji Yajima, Ohgiya Kento on Electric Piano, and Ryo Hayashi on Keyboards. Inspirits is all musical composition and all arrangement by Noro. The group recorded and released 3 albums until Casiopea reunited in 2012, again, under Noro's leadership. Both Inspirits and Casiopea are now active groups.

Discography

Solo albums 
 Sweet Sphere (1985)
 Vida (1989)
 Top Secret (1996)
 Under the Sky (2001)
 Light Up (2002)
 Best Issei (Compilation, 2003)

Inspirits
 Inner Times (2008)
 Real Time [Live DVD] (2008)
 Moments (2009)
 Smash Gig [Live] (2010)
 Beauty (2011)
 Movement (2013)
 432H     (2015)
 Turning (2017)

Casiopea 

Casiopea (1979)
Super Flight (1979)
Thunder Live (1980)
Make Up City (1980)
Eyes of the Mind (1981)
Cross Point (1981)
Mint Jams (1982)
4x4 (1982)
Photographs (1983)
Jive Jive (1983)
The Soundgraphy (1984)
Down Upbeat (1984)
Halle (1985)
Casiopea Live (1985)
Sun Sun (1986)
Casiopea Perfect Live II (1987)
Platinum (1987)
 Funky Sound Bombers (Japan-Only, 1987)
Euphony (1988)
Casiopea World Live '88 (1988)
The Party (1990)
Full Colors (1991)
Active (1992)
We Want More (1992)
Dramatic (1993)
Answers (1994)
 Hearty Notes (1994)
 Asian Dreamer (1994)
 Freshness (1995)
 Flowers (1996)
 Light and Shadows (1997)
Be (1998)
 Material (1999)
 20th (Casiopea's 20th Anniversary Album) (2000)
 Bitter Sweet (2000)
 Main Gate (2001)
 Inspire (2002)
 Places (2003)
 Marble (2004)
 GIG 25 (Casiopea's 25th Anniversary Album) (2005)
 Signal (2005)
 Gentle & Mellow (Best Studio Recordings Album, 2006)
 Groove & Passion (Best Live Performances Album, 2006)
 Legend of Casiopea (30th Anniversary Box Set, 2009)

Ottottrio 
 Super Guitar Session Hot Live! (1988)
 Super Guitar Session Red Live! (1988)
 Triptych (1998, re-released as Blu-Spec CD on Dec. 23, 2009)

See also 
 Casiopea

External links 
  (Japanese)
 CASIOPEA Official website (Japanese)

References

1957 births
Living people
Jazz fusion guitarists
Japanese jazz guitarists
Casiopea members